The Nebula Award for Best Novella is given each year by the Science Fiction and Fantasy Writers of America (SFWA) for science fiction or fantasy novellas. A work of fiction is defined by the organization as a novella if it is between 17,500 and 40,000 words; awards are also given out for pieces of longer lengths in the novel category, and for shorter lengths in the short story and novelette categories. To be eligible for Nebula Award consideration, a novella must be published in English in the United States. Works published in English elsewhere in the world are also eligible, provided they are released on either a website or in an electronic edition. The Nebula Award for Best Novella has been awarded annually since 1966. Novellas published by themselves are eligible for the novel award instead, if the author requests them to be considered as such. The award has been described as one of "the most important of the American science fiction awards" and "the science-fiction and fantasy equivalent" of the Emmy Awards.

Nebula Award nominees and winners are chosen by members of SFWA, though the authors of the nominees do not need to be members. Works are nominated each year by members in a period around December 15 through January 31, and the six works that receive the most nominations then form the final ballot, with additional nominees possible in the case of ties. Soon after, members are given a month to vote on the ballot, and the final results are presented at the Nebula Awards ceremony in May. Authors are not permitted to nominate their own works, and ties in the final vote are broken, if possible, by the number of nominations the works received. The rules were changed to their current format in 2009. Previously, the eligibility period for nominations was defined as one year after the publication date of the work, which allowed the possibility for works to be nominated in the calendar year after their publication and then be awarded in the calendar year after that. Works were added to a preliminary list for the year if they had ten or more nominations, which were then voted on to create a final ballot, to which the SFWA organizing panel was also allowed to add an additional work.

During the 58 nomination years, 195 authors have had works nominated; 54 of these have won, including co-authors and ties. Nancy Kress has won the most awards: four out of eight nominations. Robert Silverberg, John Varley, and Roger Zelazny have each won twice out of eight, two, and three nominations, respectively. Silverberg's and Kress's eight nominations are the most of any authors, followed by Lucius Shepard and Michael Bishop at seven, and Kate Wilhelm and Avram Davidson with six. Bishop has the most nominations without receiving an award for novellas, though Wilhelm and Davidson have also not won an award.

Winners and nominees
In the following table, the years correspond to the date of the ceremony, rather than when the novella was first published. Each year links to the corresponding "year in literature". Entries with a blue background and an asterisk (*) next to the writer's name have won the award; those with a white background are the other nominees on the shortlist.

  *   Winners and joint winners

See also
 Hugo Award for Best Novella

References

External links
 Nebula Awards official site

Awards established in 1966
1966 establishments in the United States
Novella
Speculative fiction award-winning novellas
Novella awards